Viini postmark is a 1967 Estonian comedy film directed by Veljo Käsper and based on the play of the same name by Ardi Liives.

In several Estonian TOP films charts, the film is included.

Plot

Cast

 Jüri Järvet - Martin Roll
 Herta Elviste - Elma, Martin's spouse
 Ines Parker - Ulvi, Roll's daughter

References

External links
 
 Viini postmark, entry in Estonian Film Database (EFIS)

1967 films
Estonian comedy films
Estonian-language films